Vania King was the defending champion, but was forced to withdraw in the quarterfinals due to a lower back injury.

Flavia Pennetta won the tournament, defeating Chan Yung-jan 6–1, 6–3 in the final.

Seeds

Draw

Finals

Top half

Bottom half

References

External links
 ITF tournament edition details

Singles
PTT Bangkok Open - Singles
 in women's tennis